Galerekwe Mase Manopole (born 1971) is a South African politician who has served as the Northern Cape MEC for Land Reform, Agriculture and Nature Conservation and Environmental Affairs since June 2020. She was the MEC for Health from May 2019 to June 2020. She joined the Northern Cape Provincial Legislature in October 2017. From May 2014 to October 2017, she was a permanent delegate to the National Council of Provinces, representing the Northern Cape. Manopole is a member of the African National Congress.

Early life and education
Manopole was born in 1971 as the fifth of six children. Her mother worked as a teacher, while her father was an entrepreneur. She spent her childhood in Warrenton. After matriculating, she enrolled for a degree in marketing and management at the Central University of Technology. She could not finish the degree, as she had to help out at her father's business. She later fulfilled a higher certificate in economic development at the University of the Western Cape in 2007.

Politics
Manopole served on the provincial leadership of the Young Communist League of South Africa. She was also the provincial treasurer of the National Education, Health and Allied Workers' Union and the chairperson of the provincial Congress of South African Trade Unions branch. After the 2014 general election, she was sworn in as a permanent delegate to the National Council of Provinces, the upper house of the Parliament of South Africa. She was one of six permanent delegates of the Northern Cape.

On 10 October 2017, Manopole was sworn in as a Member of the Northern Cape Provincial Legislature.

Provincial government
Following the general election of 8 May 2019, Zamani Saul was elected premier. He appointed Manopole to the position of Member of the Executive Council for Health on 29 May 2019. She succeeded Fufe Makatong.

On 26 June 2020, Saul appointed Manopole as MEC for Land Reform, Agriculture and Nature Conservation and Environmental Affairs. She took office on the same day and succeeded Nomandla Bloem. Maruping Lekwene succeeded her as MEC for Health.

Personal life
Manopole married in 1996. She then moved to Kimberley. She divorced in 2007 and has two sons from the marriage.

References

External links
Profile at Northern Cape Provincial Legislature

Living people
African National Congress politicians
People from the Northern Cape
Members of the Northern Cape Provincial Legislature
Members of the National Council of Provinces
1971 births
Women members of the National Council of Provinces